"Sleeping with a Friend" is a song written and performed by American rock band Neon Trees. It was originally recorded by the band for their third studio album, Pop Psychology (2014). The song was released as the first single from Pop Psychology on January 11, 2014.

Background
According to Tyler Glenn, "Sleeping with a Friend" was inspired from the album So by Peter Gabriel. Glenn stated "Sonically speaking it's our biggest-sounding song to date".

Reception
Heather Allen at Mind Equals Blown describes it as a catchy song, stating "The keyboard and drums thrown into the spotlight with the guitars subtle in the background is truly what makes gives "Sleeping With a Friend" its old-school feel."

Track listing

Charts

Weekly charts

Year-end charts

Certifications

Personnel
Neon Trees
 Tyler Glenn – lead vocals, piano, synthesizer
 Christopher Allen – guitar, backing vocals
 Branden Campbell – bass, backing vocals
 Elaine Bradley – drums, backing vocals

Release history

References

Neon Trees songs
2014 singles
2014 songs
Mercury Records singles
Songs written by Tyler Glenn
Songs written by Tim Pagnotta